Durakovo (translated as "Village of Fools") is a village in Kaluga Oblast, Russia,  south-east of Moscow.

History 
Durakovo is a  agricultural settlement that developed on a foundation of state farming of beets and cabbage. The village was named, according to local legend, when one aristocrat won it from another in a card game called “Fools”.
The Durakovo region is home to artists, priests, businessmen, and farmers – all who recently would have witnessed the birth and growth of human industry, prosperity, and sobriety due to the creation of a residential treatment center for alcoholic men. The center, also named Durakovo, is a twelve-step focused vocational and residential treatment program for individuals with alcohol and drug addictions; residents’ ages range from 15 to 67.

Documentary 
In 2008, Nino Kirtadze realized a documentary film entitled "For God, Tsar and the Fatherland" (alternative title: "Durakovo: Village of Fools"), regarding the rehabilitation centre from Durakovo, patronized by Russian Orthodox philanthropist Mikhail Morosov.

References 

Rural localities in Kaluga Oblast